Jean-Christophe Cambadélis (born 14 August 1951) is a French politician who was First Secretary of the French Socialist Party from April 2014 till June 2017. He was a member of the National Assembly of France, born in Neuilly-sur-Seine.  He represented the city of Paris, as a member of the Socialist, Republican & Citizen. He is of Greek ancestry.

References

1951 births
Living people
French people of Greek descent
People from Neuilly-sur-Seine
Politicians from Île-de-France
Paris Diderot University alumni
Socialist Party (France) politicians
Deputies of the 12th National Assembly of the French Fifth Republic
Deputies of the 13th National Assembly of the French Fifth Republic
Deputies of the 14th National Assembly of the French Fifth Republic